The United States District Court for the District of South Carolina (in case citations, D.S.C.) is the federal district court whose jurisdiction is the state of South Carolina. Court is held in the cities of Aiken, Anderson, Beaufort, Charleston, Columbia, Florence, Greenville, and Spartanburg.

Appeals from the District of South Carolina are taken to the United States Court of Appeals for the Fourth Circuit (except for patent claims and claims against the U.S. government under the Tucker Act, which are appealed to the Federal Circuit).

The United States Attorney for the District of South Carolina represents the United States in civil and criminal litigation in the court. , the United States Attorney is Adair Ford Boroughs.

History 
The District of South Carolina was one of the original 13 courts established by the Judiciary Act of 1789, on September 24, 1789. The Eastern District was headquartered at Florence, and the Western District was headquartered in Greenville. The division was solely for the purposes of holding court – a single judge presided over both districts, and the act authorized no additional court staff.

In 1898 the United States Supreme Court held in Barrett v. United States that South Carolina legally constituted a single judicial district. South Carolina was again split into Eastern and the Western Districts, with one judgeship authorized to serve both districts, effective January 1, 1912. It has since remained a single District.

Current judges 
:

Vacancies and pending nominations

Former judges

Chief judges

Succession of seats

See also 
 Courts of South Carolina
 List of current United States district judges
 List of United States federal courthouses in South Carolina

References

External links 
 United States District Court for the District of South Carolina Official Website
 United States Attorney for the District of South Carolina Official Website

South Carolina
South Carolina law
Aiken County, South Carolina
Anderson, South Carolina
Beaufort County, South Carolina
Charleston, South Carolina
Columbia, South Carolina
Florence, South Carolina
Greenville, South Carolina
Spartanburg, South Carolina
Courthouses in South Carolina
1789 establishments in South Carolina
1823 disestablishments in South Carolina
1898 establishments in the United States
1912 disestablishments in South Carolina
1965 establishments in South Carolina
Courts and tribunals established in 1789
Courts and tribunals disestablished in 1823
Courts and tribunals established in 1898
Courts and tribunals disestablished in 1912
Courts and tribunals established in 1965